Miss Teen USA 1993, the 11th Miss Teen USA pageant, was televised live from the Mississippi Gulf Coast Coliseum in Biloxi, Mississippi on 10 August 1993.  

At the conclusion of the final competition, Charlotte Lopez of Vermont was crowned by outgoing titleholder Jamie Solinger of Iowa.

The pageant was hosted by Dick Clark for the fourth and final year, with color commentary by Arthel Neville and Miss Teen USA 1985 Kelly Hu for the final time.  Music was provided by the Gulf Coast Teen Orchestra.

This was the fourth of five years that the pageant was held in Biloxi.  Contestants arrived on 26 June and were involved in two weeks of events and preliminary competition prior to the final broadcast, such as pre-taping scenes along the Mississippi coast, and being involved in an autograph signing party.

Results

Special awards
Miss Congeniality:  Julianna Kaulukukui (Hawaii)
Miss Photogenic: Melanie Breedlove (Missouri)

Historical significance 
 Vermont wins competition for the first time. Also becoming in the 10th state who wins Miss Teen USA.
 Indiana earns the 1st runner-up position for the first time and reached its highest placement ever at the pageant.
 Pennsylvania earns the 2nd runner-up position for the first time.
 Georgia finishes as Top 6  for the first time.
 Hawaii finishes as Top 6  for the first time.
 New York finishes as Top 6 for the first time.
 The only state that placed in semifinals the previous year was Indiana.
 Indiana placed for the third consecutive year.
 Georgia last placed in 1991.
 Oregon and Pennsylvania last placed in 1990.
 New York and Vermont last placed in 1989.
 Hawaii last placed in 1985.
 Tennessee last placed in 1984.
 Connecticut placed for the first time.
 Maine placed for the first time.
 Ohio placed for the first time.
 South Carolina placed for the first time.
 Kansas, North Carolina, Oklahoma and Rhode Island break an ongoing streak of placements since 1991.

Delegates
The Miss Teen USA 1993 delegates were:

 Alabama - Autumn Smith
 Alaska - Christine Michelle Thorson
 Arizona - Danielle Jean Normandin
 Arkansas - Tiffany Brooke Parks
 California - Stefanie Sweeney
 Colorado - Susie Garifi
 Connecticut - Cynthia Schneck
 Delaware - Catherine Huang
 District of Columbia - Rebecca Marie Slobig
 Florida - Allison Ann McKinney
 Georgia - Denesha Reed
 Hawaii - Juliana Maili Kaulukukui
 Idaho - Jan Cartwright
 Illinois - Jaime Lyn Holbrook
 Indiana - Kelly Ann Lloyd
 Iowa - Melissa Baxter
 Kansas - Christy Dippre
 Kentucky - Holly Renee Riggs
 Louisiana - Heather Gale DuPree
 Maine - Jill Erin Mellen
 Maryland - Angelisa Proserpi
 Massachusetts - January Louise Newcombe
 Michigan - Ashley Renai Whitt
 Minnesota - Charity Rose Lundy
 Mississippi - Bridgette Renee Kane
 Missouri - Melanie Breedlove
 Montana - Angela Hope Carter
 Nebraska - Lauriette Katherine Logan
 Nevada - Tammie Marie Rankin
 New Hampshire - Gretchen Lynn Durgin
 New Jersey - Heather Michelle Brenner
 New Mexico - Lynette Ochoa
 New York -  Sara Rae Gore
 North Carolina - Wendy Marie Williams
 North Dakota - Wendy Howe
 Ohio - Melissa Susan Yust
 Oklahoma - Stacie Caroline Case
 Oregon - Jill Marie Chartier
 Pennsylvania - Ursula Abbott
 Rhode Island - Alicia Currier
 South Carolina - Lauren Poppell
 South Dakota - Amy Rahlf
 Tennessee - Jaime Dudney
 Texas - Erin Gail Burnett
 Utah - Amy Elizabeth Carlson
 Vermont - Charlotte Anne Lopez
 Virginia - Heather Dawn Anderson
 Washington - Rebecca Kimberly Vaughn
 West Virginia - Jennifer Pringle
 Wisconsin - Tanae Gabryelle Geisler
 Wyoming - Lana Rene Hansen

Host city
Following the 1992 event, local hoteliers signalled that they may no longer be able to furnish free accommodation for the contestants for the 1993 pageant.  Although the Tourism Commission was contracted to host the pageant until 1994, they considered getting out of the contract because of the increased cost of paying for the rooms.

The pageant went ahead in Biloxi as planned, and it was estimated that the region benefitted by $1 million for hosting the event.

References

External links
Official website

1993
1993 beauty pageants
1993 in Mississippi
Youth in the United States